Fares Al-Ayyaf (born 1 March 1992) is a Saudi footballer who plays as a central midfielder.

References
 

1992 births
Living people
Saudi Arabian footballers
Al-Raed FC players
Al-Hazem F.C. players
Al-Bukayriyah FC players
Saudi Professional League players
Saudi First Division League players
Saudi Second Division players
Association football midfielders